

Events

Works published
 Fujiwara no Tameie, editor, Shokugosen Wakashū' 続後撰和歌集 ("Later Collection Continued"), an imperial anthology of Japanese waka poetry, finished three years after Retired Emperor Go-Saga ordered it in 1248;  consists of 20 volumes containing 1,368 poems

Births

Deaths
 Ibn Sahl of Seville (born 1212), Arabic language Moorish poet of Andalusia

13th-century poetry
Poetry